Tavros railway station is a station on the Piraeus–Platy railway line in Tavros, a suburb in the southwestern part of the Athens, South Athens. It opened on 1 October 2014 to serve Athens Suburban Railway lines to/from Piraeus to Kiato and Athens Airport.

History
The station opened 1 October 2014 by Minister of Transport, Michalis Chrisochoidis. as part of the upgrades and renovation to the line, which also involved electrification of the line. Initially when the station opened, it operated without the use of lifts (expected to come into operateon in early 2015). The station was not foreseen in the initial transport study proposal "Renovation of the railway line and construction of electric drive - signaling - remote control in the section Piraeus - Athens - Three Bridges", as the contract 994/2005 was called. In 2017 OSE's passenger transport sector was privatised as TrainOSE (Now Hellenic Train) , currently, a wholly-owned subsidiary of Ferrovie dello Stato Italiane infrastructure, including stations, remained under the control of OSE.

In January 2019, the station was temporarily closed, following instructions from the OSE. The closure of the station is attributed to technical reasons, according to TrainOSE. The station closed at 17.05 on Thursday, 31 January 2019. In July 2022, the station began being served by Hellenic Train, the rebranded TranOSE.

Facilities
The station building is above the platforms, with access to the platform level via stairs or lift. Access to the station is via steps or ramp. The Station buildings are also equipped with toilets and a staffed ticket office. At platform level, there are sheltered seating in a new air-conditioned indoor passenger shelter and Dot-matrix display departure and arrival screens or timetable poster boards on both platforms. There is a small car park on-site, adjacent to the eastbound line. Currently, there is no local bus stop connecting the station.

Services

Since 15 May 2022, the following weekday services call at this station:

Station layout

See also
Railway stations in Greece
Hellenic Railways Organization
Hellenic Train
Proastiakos

References

West Athens (regional unit)
Attica
Railway
Railway stations in Attica
Buildings and structures in Athens
Transport in Athens
Transport in Attica
Transport in West Attica
Railway stations opened in 2014